Jean-Pierre Gallet (7 April 1943 – 11 February 2020) was a Belgian journalist who worked for RTBF.

Biography
Gallet began working in media in 1976 with La Première. He then hosted the television program bulletin d'information from 1982 to 1988 with Georges Moucheron, Jean-Jacques Jespers, and Françoise Van De Moortel. He became news director in 1995, then left the organization in 2004.

Jean-Pierre Gallet died on 11 February 2020.

References

1943 births
2020 deaths
Belgian journalists
Male journalists